Ramita Navai (born July 21, 1973) is an Emmy and Robert F. Kennedy award-winning British-Iranian journalist, documentary producer and author. She has reported from over forty countries and has a reputation for investigations and work in hostile environments.

Early life
Ramita Navai was born in Tehran, Iran. She moved to London after the Iranian Revolution.

Career
After a postgraduate degree in journalism at City University, London, where she won the Broadcast Journalism Training Council Young Journalist of the Year award, Navai worked as the Tehran correspondent for The Times from 2003–06, where she covered events including the Bam earthquake, and parliamentary and presidential elections. She has reported from more than forty countries, including reporting for the UN in Iran, Pakistan and Iraqi Kurdistan. She has made twenty documentaries for Channel 4's current affairs series Unreported World.  For ITN / Channel 4 News  she has made various features, including investigating child trafficking in India, and police gang killings in Brazil. Her report Macedonia: Tracking Down the Refugee Kidnap Gangs won the London Foreign Press Association for News Story of the Year: TV award, the Royal Television Society for The Independent Award.

More recently she has reported on ISIS in Iraq (2017), and the UN Peacekeepers in the Central African Republic and the Democratic Republic of the Congo (2018). She has written for many publications including The Times, The Sunday Times, The Guardian, The Independent, the New Statesman, The Irish Times.

In 2012 she won an Emmy award for her undercover report from Syria for PBS's Frontline. In September 2014 she appeared on The Daily Show with Jon Stewart.

In 2017 she reported and produced the Frontline PBS documentary Iraq Uncovered, which was also broadcast on Channel 4 with the title ISIS and the Battle for Iraq. Iraq Uncovered/ISIS and the Battle for Iraq won the Robert F. Kennedy Journalism Award (International Television), the British Journalism Award for Foreign Affairs Journalism, and the Frontline Club award for Broadcast Journalism. It was also nominated for two Emmy Awards (Outstanding Investigation and Outstanding Research).

In 2017-2018 she produced and reported the Frontline PBS, Channel 4 and ARTE documentary the UN Sex Abuse Scandal which was broadcast in 2018.

City of Lies: Love, Sex, Death and the Search for Truth in Tehran

City of Lies: Love, Sex, Death and the Search for Truth in Tehran was published in the UK by Weidenfeld and Nicolson in May 2014 and in the US by PublicAffairs in September 2014. Based on extensive interviews and research City of Lies is an intimate portrait of modern Iran. It chronicles the lives of eight protagonists drawn from across the spectrum of Iranian society. It has been translated into five languages. City of Lies won Debut Political Book of the Year Award at the Political Book Awards as well as the Royal Society of Literature's Jerwood Award. It was a Book of the Year in both the Evening Standard (2014) and The Spectator.

Reviews 
Jon Stewart, The Daily Show:The stories are beautiful, and they’re so well-detailed and nuanced.Anthony Loyd: One of the world’s most exciting cities, as revealed by one of journalism’s most exciting women. Navai slips effortlessly into the boots of earthy, urban writer to tour Tehran’s ripped backsides in this intimate, grand guignol debut. She transports us through the Iranian capital’s multiple personas with deft and knowing navigation: never short of love for even the lowliest of her fellow Tehranis. An intimate and devoted portrait, lifting a beautiful truth from a city masked in lies.Eliza Griswold, The Sunday Telegraph:A talented writer, she quickly sucks us in with her first character ... Navai has a reporter’s eye for the telling detail… this is a timely and beautifully written insight into the lives of Tehranis.

Documentaries

Awards and nominations

Books

 City of Lies: Love, Sex, Death and the Search for Truth in Tehran. London: Weidenfeld & Nicolson, 2014, . 
Vivre et mentir à Téhéran, Stock, 2015, .
 Stadt der Lügen. Liebe, Sex und Tod in Teheran, Kein & Aber Verlag, 2016, .
Orasul minciunilor, 
Город лжи. Любовь. Секс. Смерть. Вся правда о Тегеране, 2018, 
Miasto kłamstw. Cała prawda o Teheranie, 2014, 
 "Iran: Coming out from the Cold?" In Shifting Sands: The Unravelling of the Old Order in the Middle East, edited by Raja Shehadeh and Penny Johnson, 113–127. London: Profile Books.

See also
 Unreported World, a Channel 4 documentary series

References

External links
Channel 4 - Unreported World Profile
Ramita Navai Facebook page
Ramita Navai Twitter page

Iranian journalists
British people of Iranian descent
British journalists
Iranian women journalists
Living people
1973 births